The Boethusians were a Jewish sect closely related to, if not a development of, the Sadducees.

Origins according to the Talmud

The post-Talmudic work Avot of Rabbi Natan gives the following origin of the schism between the Pharisees and Sadducees/Boethusians: Antigonus of Sokho having taught the maxim, "Be not like the servants who serve their masters for the sake of the wages, but be rather like those who serve without thought of receiving wages", his two pupils, Zadok and Boethus, repeated this maxim to their pupils. In the course of time, either the two teachers or their pupils understood this to express the belief that there was neither an afterlife nor a resurrection of the dead and founded the sects of the Sadducees and the Boethusians. They lived in luxurious splendor; using silver and golden vessels all their lives, not because they were haughty, but because (as they claimed) the Pharisees led a hard life on earth and yet would have nothing to show for it in the world to come.

This story is historical, in that the two groups, the Sadducees and the Boethusians, denied the immortality of the soul and the resurrection. Again, the Midrash is on the whole correct in saying that the sects found their followers chiefly among the wealthy; but the origin of the sects is legendary. The Mishnah, as well as the Baraita, mentions the Boethusians as opposing the Pharisees in saying that the sheaf due at the Passover (compare Omer) must be offered not on the second feast-day, but on the day after the actual Shabbat of the festival week, and, accordingly, that Shavuot, which comes seven weeks and one day later, should always be celebrated on Sunday. In another passage it is narrated that the Boethusians hired false witnesses in order to lead the Pharisees astray in their calculations of the new moon. Another point of dispute between the Boethusians and the Pharisees was whether the high priest should prepare the incense inside or outside the Holy of Holies on Yom Kippur

As the beginnings of this sect are shrouded in obscurity, so also is the length of its duration. The Talmud mentions a Boethusian in a dispute with a pupil of Rabbi Akiva (Shab. 108a; Soferim i. 2); yet it is probable that the word here means simply a sectarian, a heretic, just as the term "Sadducee" was used in a much wider sense later on. A Boethus, son of Zonim, and nearly contemporaneous with Akiva (compare Yer. l.c. 10b), is mentioned in the Mishnah (B. M. v. 3); he was not, however, a Boethusian, but a pious merchant. An amora, c. 300 CE, was also called "Boethus".

Relationship to other groups

A parallel to the Yoma 19b has "Sadducees" instead of "Boethusians"; and in other passages the Talmud undoubtedly uses these two terms indifferently in designating the same sect. Graetz's assumption, therefore, that the Sadducees were the political and the Boethusians the religious opponents of the Pharisees, is untenable.

Some scholars have identified the Boethusians with the Essenes, the sect that produced the Dead Sea Scrolls. Some of the scrolls express views similar to those attributed to the Boethusians by the Talmud.  According to this theory, the word "Boethusian" is a corruption of "Beit Essaya", meaning "House of Essenes".

A high-priestly family

The Boethusians are believed to have been associated with the members of the high-priestly family of Boethus. The family of Boethus produced the following high priests:

Simon son of Boethus

Simon, son of Boethus from Alexandria, was made a high priest about 25 BCE by Herod the Great, in order that his marriage with Boethus's daughter, Mariamne, might not be regarded as a mésalliance, a marriage with a person thought to be unsuitable or of a lower social position.

Joazar, son of Boethus
(4 BCE and before 6 CE), unpopular and an advocate of compliance with the Census of Quirinius

Eleazar, son of Boethus
(4-3 BCE) independently attested in the Mandaean Book of John.

Simon Cantheras, son of Boethus
(41-42 CE)

Elioneus, son of Simon Cantheras

Joshua ben Gamla
(64 CE), whose wife Martha belonged to the house

The hatred of the Pharisees toward this high-priestly family is shown by the words of the tanna Abba Saul b. Baṭnit, who lived about the year 40 CE at Jerusalem. It must be especially noticed that "the house of Boethus" heads the list of the wicked and sinful priestly families enumerated by Abba.

References

Bibliography
Eduard Baneth, "Ueber den Ursprung der Sadokäer und Boethus." Berliner-Hoffmann, Magazin, ix.1-37, 61-95 (also printed separately, Dessau, 1882); 
Geiger, Urschrift, 1857, pp. 105 et seq.; 
Heinrich Grätz, Gesch. der Juden, iii.89, 223, 4th ed.; 
Emil Schürer, Gesch. ii.217-218, 409–419.

External links
Who Were the Boethusians?
Who Were the Boethusians? II

Jews and Judaism in the Roman Empire
Jewish religious movements
High Priests of Israel